Wyoming Highway 232 (WYO 232) is a  state highway in southeastern Lincoln County, Wyoming, United States, that serves the town of Cokeville and outlying areas to the northeast.

Route description
WYO 232, locally named Smith Forks Road, travels from an intersection with US Route 30/Wyoming Highway 89 and Wyoming Highway 231 in Cokeville northeast to the Button Flat. WYO 232 heads north toward the Commissary Ridge of the Bridger-Teton National Forest.  The Cokeville city limits are at Milepost 0.09, and Highway 232 ends at Milepost 12.22 with local roadways near the National Forest.

Major intersections

See also

 List of state highways in Wyoming
 List of highways numbered 232

References

External links

 Wyoming Routes 200-299
 WYO 232 - US 30/WYO 89/WYO 231 to Smith Forks Road

Transportation in Lincoln County, Wyoming
232